Zenzizenzizenzic is an obsolete form of mathematical notation representing the eighth power of a number (that is, the zenzizenzizenzic of x is x8), dating from a time when powers were written out in words rather than as superscript numbers. This term was suggested by Robert Recorde, a 16th-century Welsh physician, mathematician and writer of popular mathematics textbooks, in his 1557 work The Whetstone of Witte (although his spelling was zenzizenzizenzike); he wrote that it "doeth represent the square of squares squaredly".

At the time Recorde proposed this notation, there was no easy way of denoting the powers of numbers other than squares and cubes. The root word for Recorde's notation is zenzic, which is a German spelling of the medieval Italian word , meaning 'squared'. Since the square of a square of a number is its fourth power, Recorde used the word zenzizenzic (spelled by him as zenzizenzike) to express it. Similarly, as the sixth power of a number is equal to the square of its cube, Recorde used the word zenzicubike  to express it; a more modern spelling, zenzicube, is found in Samuel Jeake's Arithmetick Surveighed and Reviewed. Finally, the word zenzizenzizenzic denotes the square of the square of a number's square, which is its eighth power: in modern notation,

Recorde proposed three mathematical terms by which any power (that is, index or exponent) greater than 1 could be expressed: zenzic, i.e. squared; cubic; and sursolid, i.e. raised to a prime number greater than three, the smallest of which is five.  Sursolids were as follows: 5 was the first; 7, the second; 11, the third; 13, the fourth; etc.

Therefore, a number raised to the power of six would be zenzicubic, a number raised to the power of seven would be the second sursolid, hence bissursolid (not a multiple of two and three), a number raised to the twelfth power would be the "zenzizenzicubic" and a number raised to the power of ten would be the square of the (first) sursolid.  The fourteenth power was the square of the second sursolid, and the twenty-second was the square of the third sursolid.

Jeake's text appears to designate a written exponent of 0 as being equal to an "absolute number, as if it had no Mark", thus using the notation x0 to refer to x alone, while a written exponent of 1, in his text, denotes "the Root of any number", thus using the notation x1 to refer to what is now denoted x0.5.

The word, as well as the system, is obsolete except as a curiosity; the Oxford English Dictionary (OED) has only one citation for it.
As well as being a mathematical oddity, it survives as a linguistic oddity: zenzizenzizenzic has more Zs than any other word in the OED.

Samuel Jeake gives zenzizenzizenzizenzike (the square of the square of the square of the square, or 16th power) in a table in A Compleat Body of Arithmetick:

Notes

References
.
.
.
.
.

See also 

 Prime factor exponent notation

External links

Entry at World Wide Words

Archaic English words and phrases
History of mathematics
Medieval European mathematics
Mathematical notation